Nebaliella is a genus of Leptostracan crustaceans within the family Nebaliidae. There are currently 7 species assigned to the genus.

Species 
 Nebaliella antarctica 
 Nebaliella brevicarinata 
 Nebaliella caboti 
 Nebaliella declivatas 
 Nebaliella extrema 
 Nebaliella kurila 
 Nebaliella ochotica

References 

Leptostraca
Malacostraca genera